Todd Williams is an Australian singer and songwriter from Dubbo, New South Wales. He was the first indigenous winner of the Star Maker at Tamworth and won a Deadly in 2003 for Best Country Artist. His first album, Ten 'Till Midnight, was recorded live and released in 2004.

Todd has a now 16 year old son named Jerrone who is his world.

Discography
Ten 'till midnight (2004) - Secret Street
 "Falling Down" - ABC Country

References

Indigenous Australian musicians
Australian male singers
Living people
Year of birth missing (living people)